The 1st Crunchyroll Anime Awards were held on January 28, 2017, honoring excellence in anime from 2016. The awards were first announced by Crunchyroll in December 2016. The voting period was open from January 3 to 10. The results were announced on January 11 except for the Anime of the Year award, which was announced live on January 28. Crunchyroll reported that 1.8 million votes from around the world were submitted, with the majority of them coming from the United States. It is the only edition that implemented the "Most Popular Other".

Records 
Kabaneri of the Iron Fortress dominated the list of nominees, with a total of nine nominations including the Anime of the Year. Mob Psycho 100 followed the lead with eight nominations, including the Anime of the Year. Yuri on Ice won all of its seven nominations, including the inaugural Anime of the Year award, albeit amid controversy about the Crunchyroll users who complained that the awards won did not deserve especially accusing fans of the series for rigging the vote.

Winners and nominees

Statistics

Notes

References

2017 awards in the United States
Crunchyroll
January 2017 events in the United States